The 1984–85 Los Angeles Clippers season was their 15th season in the NBA, their first season in the city of Los Angeles. Team owner and real estate mogul Donald Sterling, who for the past two seasons had been trying to move the team from San Diego, finally succeeded.

Draft picks

Roster
{| class="toccolours" style="font-size: 95%; width: 100%;"
|-
! colspan="2" style="background-color: #CC0033;  color: #FFFFFF; text-align: center;" | Los Angeles Clippers 1984-85 roster
|- style="background-color: #106BB4; color: #FFFFFF;   text-align: center;"
! Players !! Coaches
|-
| valign="top" |
{| class="sortable" style="background:transparent; margin:0px; width:100%;"
! Pos. !! # !! Nat. !! Name !! Ht. !! Wt. !! From
|-

Roster Notes
 With the team moving from San Diego to Los Angeles, point guard Norm Nixon becomes the first former Laker to play with its crosstown rival, the new Los Angeles Clippers.

Regular season

Season standings

z - clinched division title
y - clinched division title
x - clinched playoff spot

Record vs. opponents

Game log

Player statistics

Awards, records and milestones

Awards
 Center James Donaldson led the league in field goal percentage this season at .637 - still one of the ten highest percentages in NBA history.

Week/Month

All-Star
 Norm Nixon selected as a reserve guard for the Western Conference All-Stars.  This is his second All-Star Game appearance.  This also makes Nixon the very first Los Angeles Clipper All-Star selection and the first franchise All-Star since World B. Free then with the San Diego Clippers was selected in 1980.

Season

Records

Milestones

Transactions
The Clippers were involved in the following transactions during the 1984–85 season.

Trades

Free agents

Additions

Subtractions

References

Los Angeles Clippers seasons
Los